A blood brother is a male who swears loyalty to another male.

Blood Brother, Blood Brothers, Bloodbrothers, or The Blood Brothers may also refer to:

Film

 Blood Brothers (1973 film), a Hong Kong film by Chang Cheh
 Blood Brothers (1975 film), an East German film by Werner W. Wallroth
 Bloodbrothers (1978 film), a film starring Richard Gere, based on a novel by Richard Price (see below)
 Blood Brothers (1993 film), a made-for-television film featuring Richard Yearwood
 Blood Brothers (1996 film), a documentary about a Bruce Springsteen and The E Street Band reunion
 Blood Brothers (2004 film) (Jiang Hu), a Hong Kong gang film
 Bloodbrothers (2005 film), a Swedish film starring Sofia Helin
 Blood Brothers (2007 Chinese film), a Chinese film by Alexi Tan
The Warlords or The Blood Brothers, a 2007 Chinese film 
 Blood Brothers (2007 Indian film), an AIDS-awareness film produced by the Bill Gates foundation
 Blood Brothers (2011 film), an Australian TV film featuring Cariba Heine
 Blood Brother (2013 film), a 2013 Sundance Film Festival documentary
 Blood Brother (2018 film), a WWE film
Blood Brothers (film series), an Australian documentary series

Literature

 Blood Brothers (comics), two Marvel Comics characters
 Bloodbrothers (Price novel), a 1976 novel by Richard Price
 Blood Brother (Traces novel), a novel by Malcolm Rose
 Blood Brother (Arnold novel), an Armed Services Edition by Elliott Arnold
 Blood Brothers (Fyle novel), a novel by Clifford Nelson Fyle
 Blood Brothers (Lumley novel), a 1992 novel by Brian Lumley
 Blood Brothers (Haffner novel), a 1932 novel by Ernst Haffner

Music
 Blood Brothers (musical), a 1983 musical by Willy Russell
 Blood Brothers (1995 album), a London cast recording of the musical
 The Blood Brothers (band), an American post-hardcore band

Albums
 Bloodbrothers (album), a 1978 album by The Dictators
 Blood Brothers (Kastro and E.D.I. album) (2002)
 Blood Brothers (OuterSpace album) (2006)
 Blood Brothers (Blind Channel album) (2018)
 Blood Brothers (EP), a 1996 EP by Bruce Springsteen & the E Street Band released with the documentary
 Bloodbrothers, an album by Gil Mantera's Party Dream

Songs
 "Blood Brother" (Tom Robinson song) (1990)
 "Blood Brothers", a song by Luke Bryan from Crash My Party
 "Blood Brothers", a song by Earth, Wind & Fire from Millennium
 "Blood Brothers", a song by Iron Maiden from Brave New World
 "Blood Brothers", a song by Ingrid Michaelson from Human Again
 "Blood Brothers", a song by Malevolent Creation from Eternal
 "Blood Brothers", a song by Manowar from Gods of War
 "Blood Brothers", a song by Papa Roach from Infest
 "Blood Brothers", a song by Amy Shark from Night Thinker

Television episodes

 "Blood Brother" (Conan the Adventurer)
 "Blood Brothers" (CSI: Miami)
 "Blood Brothers" (Law & Order: Special Victims Unit)
 "Blood Brothers" (M*A*S*H)
 "Blood Brothers" (MacGyver)
 "Blood Brothers" (The Outer Limits)
 "Blood Brother" (Roswell)
 "Blood Brothers" (The Vampire Diaries)
 "Blood Brothers: The Joey DiPaolo Story", episode of Lifestories: Families in Crisis about Joey DiPaolo, an 11-year-old living with HIV

Other uses
 Blood Brothers Machine Company, an American company
 Blood Bros., a 1990 arcade game

See also
 Blood Sisters (disambiguation)
 Brother's Blood, a 2009 album by Kevin Devine